Michael Martin Kaminski (born July 29), known professionally as Plaza (stylized as PLAZA), is a Canadian singer, songwriter and producer from Toronto, Ontario. He is best known for his singles "Personal", "All Mine", and "Use Me". From 2017 to 2021 he was signed to OVO Sound, the record label co-founded by rapper Drake, producer Noah "40" Shebib and Oliver El-Khatib.

Music career 

During the early 2010s, Plaza started out as a lead singer in a pop-punk band called Decades, as well as a synth-pop band called Lobby.

Plaza officially released his debut EP, One, on SoundCloud on August 29, 2016. However, he had released every track on the set over the past year, building up a gradual fanbase despite little information and no press.

He premiered his new song "Personal" on The Fader in November 2016. Later that month, the song featured in Complex's "The best Canadian songs of November".

In December 2016, BuzzFeed included Plaza in their list of "17 artists to watch out for in 2017". Two months later, he featured in Now Toronto's "Toronto musicians to watch in 2017: R&B and pop edition".

Plaza signed a record deal with Drake's OVO Sound label in June 2017. In doing so, he became the first artist to join in over a year, following the signing of R&B duo dvsn in February 2016. The news broke during an episode of OVO Sound Radio, with El-Khatib debuting Plaza's second EP, Shadow, at the end of the show, and describing him as the "newest member of the OVO Sound family".

On December 22, Plaza released two new singles titled "All Mine" and "Pick Up".

On 19 October 2018, Plaza released a single titled "Switch".

A month later, on 30 November 2018, Plaza released "Touch & Go".

After a 3-year hiatus from music and social media, Plaza returned on June 18, 2021. After replying to fans' comments from a 2019 post, he announced a new single titled "Still Alive", which was released on June 25, 2021 under his Shadow Records imprint.

Three Weeks later, on July 16, 2021, Plaza released “Use Me”

On August 13, 2021, Plaza released "Get Even".

On September 23, 2021, Plaza announced that his debut studio album, Nocturnes, would be released October 1.

Following Nocturnes, Plaza has released a string of singles between 2022 and 2023: "Demons", "Crash", "Never Left My Mind", "Voodoo", "Voodoo II", "Tragedy", and "Who Is He". Plaza has hinted that he is working on his second studio album, and it is currently unknown which of these songs will be on the official tracklist.

Personal life

Hidden identity 
In November 2016, Plaza revealed in an interview with Noisey that he keeps his identity a secret as a "comfort thing" but expects it to be revealed in the future. He also explained that there is no meaning behind his stage name, and it is purely for aesthetics.

Artistry

Musical style 
Plaza's music has often been compared to the early style of The Weeknd. He addressed the similarities in 2016, saying: "I don't like to make comparisons. I'm really trying to be my own artist." Critics have also compared his musical style to PartyNextDoor, as well as underground artists Anders and K. Forest.

Speaking about his style, Plaza said: "I want my music to feel like a soundtrack for anyone driving at night. I have visuals always playing in the studio—city lights or slow drives through the town. It's that late-night sound, something you listen to while cruising."

Discography

Studio albums

Extended plays

Singles

References

External links 
 Plaza on Soundcloud

Living people
Canadian contemporary R&B singers
Musicians from Toronto
OVO Sound artists
Warner Records artists
Year of birth missing (living people)